Grodzka Street may refer to:

Grodzka Street, Bydgoszcz
Grodzka Street, Kraków